The Macau Grand Prix is a single seater car race that is held annually on the Guia Circuit in Macau's streets on the third or fourth weekend of November. It was founded in 1954 by Fernando Macedo Pinto, Carlos da Silva and Paulo Antas as a local treasure hunt for car enthusiasts in the Pearl River Delta territory, but Swiss expatriate Paul Dutoit suggested that the route be used for local professional motor races. The race has variously been held to sports car, Formula Libre, Formula Pacific, Formula 3 (F3) and Formula 4 (F4) regulations throughout its history, and drivers consider it an event to progress to higher class series such as Formula One. The event is composed of two races: an eight-lap qualifying race to decide the starting order for the twelve-lap main event. Each winner is presented with a trophy at a ceremony on a podium following the conclusion of both events and the final results of the main race determines the winner.

John MacDonald holds the record for the most Macau Grand Prix victories with four. Jan Bussell, António Félix da Costa, Arsenio Laurel, Geoff Lees, Edoardo Mortara, Riccardo Patrese, Felix Rosenqvist and Dan Ticktum are the eight drivers to have won the race twice. Six drivers have won the race twice in succession but none have claimed three or more consecutive victories. Laurel was the first driver to achieve consecutive victories when he won the 1962 and 1963 races. MacDonald holds the record for the longest period of time between two race victories–seven years between the 1965 and 1972 events. He also has the record for the longest period of time between his first Grand Prix win and his last–ten years between the 1965 and 1975 iterations. It has been won by British drivers 14 times, followed by Hong Kong racers with 9 wins and Italian competitors and drivers from Macau have taken 5 victories each. Theodore Racing have the highest number of victories of any team under all six regulations the race has been held to with 8, followed by Team TOM'S with 5. Ticktum is the race's youngest winner; he was 18 years and 5 months old when he won the 2017 race.

As of the 2022 edition, there have been 56 race winners in the 69 editions of the event. The race's first winner was the local driver Eduardo de Carvalho at the 1954 sports car event, and the most recent competitor to achieve their first victory in the territory was Wing Chung Chang of Macau who took his first win in the 2022 F4 race. Hon Chio Leong was the first local driver to win the Grand Prix twice in succession in the 2020 and 2021 F4 events. The first competitor to win the event held to F3 regulations was the Brazilian driver Ayrton Senna for the West Surrey Racing team in the 1983 edition. Winners of the qualifying races, the support events and the Macau motorcycle Grand Prix are not included in this list.

Winners

Records

By driver

By nationality

By entrant

Notes

References

Bibliography

External links
 

Auto racing lists
Winners